Grant Briggs   (March 16, 1865 – May 31, 1928) was a 19th-century Major League Baseball catcher and outfielder. He began his professional baseball career in the Eastern League in 1887 and was playing with the Syracuse Stars of the International Association in 1889 when the Stars decided to join the American Association for the 1890 season. He appeared in 86 games for the Starrs and also played for the Louisville Colonels in 1891 and St. Louis Browns in 1892. He played minor league ball again in 1893 and was out of baseball in 1894 before he returned to the Colonels for one more game in 1895.

External links
Baseball-Reference page

1865 births
1928 deaths
19th-century baseball players
Major League Baseball catchers
Major League Baseball outfielders
Syracuse Stars (AA) players
Louisville Colonels players
St. Louis Browns (NL) players
Danbury Hatters players
Worcester Grays players
Syracuse Stars (minor league baseball) players
Reading Actives players
Binghamton Bingoes players
Oil City Oilers players
Twin Cities Twins players
Washington Little Senators players
Baseball players from Pennsylvania
Marinette (minor league baseball) players